Rosaline (pronounced "Rah-za-lynn") was a six-piece post-hardcore band from Chicago, Illinois that formed in 2005.  The group modeled their sound from early 2000s post-hardcore groups, citing influences from Thursday, Underoath, Hopesfall, Taking Back Sunday and The Bled.  Over the span of their career Rosaline released three albums on various independent record labels.

History

Inception and A Constant North
In an interview with Absolute Punk, keyboardist Nate Steinheimer commented that "Rosaline formed the way most bands do, a bunch of kids in high school who weren't any good at sports and who weren't that cool, so we just played music instead". Pulling inspiration from other groups involved in the early 2000s post-hardcore movement, Rosaline independently released their debut 8 track EP We're All Just Passing Through in 2005 with lead singer Joe Welch, who left the band shortly after to join the military. The band was inactive during most of 2006 and 2007 until guitarist Madison Stolzer returned after briefly joining the group Emarosa.

On April 27, 2009 Rosaline announced their signing to Eulogy Records during an on-air interview with Chicago's rock radio station Q101. The band released A Constant North for the label on July 21, 2009. Produced by Joey Sturgis and Joel Wanasek, guitarist Madison Stolzer described the album by saying: "A Constant North is always there, ya know? The album will always be there; those emotions are pretty much always going to live on"  "A Constant North" was re-released in December 2009 in Japan through the major label Avex.  The Japanese version included new artwork and re-mastered audio.

The Vitality Theory and disestablishment
In a video featured on the Alternative Press website in April 2010, Rosaline revealed that they had begun tracking for their debut full-length album The Vitality Theory. The album was released on July 20 under the label Good Fight Music and was well received by the musical community. Absolute Punk gave it a "93%" rating, calling it "an album of the year and sleeper album of the year contender". The song "Model Ships" was released as downloadable content for the video game Rock Band 2 and Rock Band 3 on December 5, 2010. Additionally, the song "It's Just Better For Everyone" was featured in a season 6 episode of the reality television series Bad Girls Club.

It was announced on July 1, 2011 through the Rosaline Facebook page that they were departing from the music industry. The reasons for the departure are unknown.  One of the members later updated the page explaining; "We didn't break up, we went down together".  They released one final song as a free download for their fans entitled "Edge of An Era".

Following their dissolution, several members went on to pursue different musical ventures.  Bassist Ryan Pulice briefly joined fellow Illinois post-hardcore act The Color Morale.  Keyboardist Nate Steinheimer launched the independent label  Mutant League Records in partnership with Victory Records.

As of October 24, 2016, four of the members have united to form RIVAL. A music video was released for their track 'Odds'.

Band members
Final Lineup
 Madison Stolzer - Guitar and Vocals (2005-2011)
 Christopher Maxson - Lead Guitar (2005-2009)
 Nick Jones - Lead Vocals (2005-2009) 
 Ryan Prindle - Drums (2005-2009)
 Nathan Steinheimer - Keyboards and Vocals (2005-2011)
 Ryan Pulice - Bass (2005-2011)
 Cody Lumpkin - Lead Vocals (2009-2011)
 Ricky Bakosh - Guitar and Vocals (2009-2011)
 Matt Hahn - Drums (2009-2011)

Discography 
Studio albums

EPs
 We're All Just Passing Through (2005, Independently Released)

References

Musical groups established in 2005
American post-hardcore musical groups
Emo musical groups from Illinois
Musical groups disestablished in 2011
Eulogy Recordings artists